Rishad Hossain (born 15 July 2002) is a Bangladeshi cricketer. He made his first-class debut for North Zone in the 2018–19 Bangladesh Cricket League on 5 December 2018. He made his Twenty20 debut for Khelaghar Samaj Kallyan Samity in the 2018–19 Dhaka Premier Division Twenty20 Cricket League on 25 February 2019. In November 2019, he was selected to play for the Rangpur Rangers in the 2019–20 Bangladesh Premier League.

In February 2021, he was selected in the Bangladesh Emerging squad for their home series against the Ireland Wolves. He made his List A debut on 24 March 2022, for Khelaghar Samaj Kallyan Samity in the 2021–22 Dhaka Premier Division Cricket League.

References

External links
 

2002 births
Living people
Bangladeshi cricketers
Bangladesh North Zone cricketers
Khelaghar Samaj Kallyan Samity cricketers
People from Rangpur District